Al-Kamal ibn al-Humam was a prominent Egyptian Hanafi-Maturidi, polymath, legal theorist and jurist. He was a mujtahid and highly regarded in many sciences of knowledge and was also a Sufi. Highly regarded in all fields of knowledge, including fiqh, usul al-fiqh, kalam (Islamic theology), logic, Sufism, Arabic language and literature, tafsir (Qur'anic exegesis), Hadith, Islamic law of inheritance (in Arabic, known as 'ilm al-fara'id, or 'the science of [ancestral] shares'), mathematics, and music.

He is famous for his commentary known as Fath al-Qadeer on the famous Hanafi book al-Hidayah.

Name 
He is Kamal al-Din Muhammad ibn 'Abd al-Wahid ibn 'Abd al-Hamid ibn Mas'ud al-Siwasi, then al-Iskandari, known and often referred to as Ibn al-Humam.

Life 
He was born in Alexandria, Egypt, and studied in Cairo as well as Aleppo. His ancestry was from the Turkish province of Sivas, but he was born in Alexandria and grew up and died in Cairo. He was appointed head shaykh of the Khanaqah Shaykhuniyyah in Cairo in 1443.

Teachers 

He studied under many notable scholars, among them are:
 'Izz al-Din ibn Jama'a (d. 819/1416).
 Ibn Hajar al-'Asqalani (d. 825/1449).
 Wali al-Din Abu Zur'a al-'Iraqi (d. 826/1423) the son of Zain al-Din al-'Iraqi.
 Badr al-Din al-'Ayni (d. 855/1451).

Students 
Among his celebrated students are:
 Sharaf al-Din Yahya al-Munawi (d. 871/1467) (whose great-grandson 'Abd al-Ra'uf al-Munawi would write a commentary on al-Suyuti's al-Jami' al-Saghir).
 Ibn Amir al-Hajj (d. 879/1474).
 Ibn Qutlubugha (d. 879/1474).
 Badr al-Din Abu al-Yusr Muhammad ibn al-Ghars (d. 894/1488).
 Shams al-Din al-Sakhawi (d. 902/1497).
 Kamal al-Din ibn Abi Sharif (d. 905-906/1499-1500).
 Jalal al-Din al-Suyuti (d. 911/1505).
 Zakariyya al-Ansari (d. 926/1520).

Books 
Among his well-known writings are:
 Fath al-Qadeer lil-'Ajiz al-Faqeer.
 Al-Musayara fi al-'Aqaid al-Munjiya fi al-Akhira, a Maturidi theological treatise that follows the sequence of Imam al-Ghazali's tract on dogmatic theology called al-Risala al-Qudsiyya (The Jerusalem Epistle); hence, the name al-Musāyarah (the Pursuit).
 Zad al-Faqeer, a treatise on the rulings of prayer and purification.

See also 
 Badr al-Din al-'Ayni
 Akmal al-Din al-Babarti
 Khidr Bey
 List of Hanafis
 List of Ash'aris and Maturidis
 List of Muslim theologians
 List of Sufis

References

External links
 The Life and Works of al-Kamāl Ibn al-Humām
 Al-Kamal ibn al-Humam and His Book: Fath al-Qadeer 

Hanafis
Maturidis
People from Alexandria 
15th-century Muslim theologians
15th-century Muslims 
Shaykh al-Islāms
Sunni fiqh scholars
Sunni imams
Sunni Sufis
Egyptian Sufis
Egyptian people of Turkish descent
Egyptian imams
Egyptian Sunni Muslims 
1388 births
1457 deaths